Georgia took part in the Junior Eurovision Song Contest 2017 as the host country after their victory in 2016 with the song "Mzeo" by Mariam Mamadashvili. Their entry was decided through an internal selection.
They were represented by Grigol Kipshidze and the song "Voice of The Heart".

Background

Before Junior Eurovision
On 29 July 2017 the Georgian broadcaster GPB announced they were going to select their entrant internally, opening the submissions period until 1 September 2017. The winner of the selection process was be decided by a professional jury.
Then, on 6 September 2017, the GPB announced that their entrant would be revealed later that week on 8 September 2017; whereas the song will be revealed at a later point. They did as expected, and on 8 September 2017 the GPB confirmed that their representative for the 2017 contest is Grigol Kipshidze.

Artist and song information

Grigol Kipshidze
Grigol Kipshidze (born 15 August 2005) is a Georgian singer who represented Georgia in the Junior Eurovision Song Contest 2017. Prior to his Junior Eurovision experience, he studied at the National Center for Folklore between 2011 and 2015, and in 2014 he entered the Vocal Academy of Tbilisi. He has also participated in various singing contests, achieving the most successful result at the 2017 edition of X-Factor Georgia, where he made it to the final.

"Voice of the Heart"
"Voice of the Heart" (Gulis khma) is a song by Georgian singer Grigol Kipshidze. It represented Georgia in the Junior Eurovision Song Contest 2017 and reached the 2nd place with 185 points. It marked only the second time a song from the host nation finished second.

At Junior Eurovision
During the opening ceremony and the running order draw which took place on 20 November 2017, Georgia was drawn to perform ninth on 26 November 2017, following Macedonia and preceding Albania.

Voting

Detailed voting results

References

Junior Eurovision Song Contest
Georgia (country)
2017